Jack Borthwick (27 August 1884 – 21 September 1948) was an Australian rules footballer who played with Essendon in the Victorian Football League (VFL).

Notes

External links 

1884 births
1948 deaths
Australian rules footballers from Melbourne
Essendon Football Club players
Footscray Football Club (VFA) players